Diploclema is an extinct genus of bryozoan belonging to the monotypic family Dipoclemidae, found from the Middle Ordovician to the Middle Silurian. It has pear-shaped autozooecia which grow in a biradial pattern, and its colonies have a dichotomously branching shape. Its laminated exterior wall possesses a prismatic structure, which is unique among the cyclostome bryozoans.

References

Prehistoric bryozoan genera
Ordovician
Silurian